The E8 European long distance path or E8 path is one of the European long-distance paths, leading 4,700 km (2,920 miles) across Europe, from Cork in Ireland to Bulgaria.

Route
After Ireland it crosses the Irish Sea into Wales and then into England, where it follows part of the Trans Pennine Trail. After crossing the North Sea, it passes through the Netherlands, Germany, Austria, Slovakia, Poland, Ukraine and Romania. It finally crosses Bulgaria before reaching the border to Turkey.

History
It was the first European long-distance path to be designated, and opened, in the UK. The section was opened in 1996.

Some of the eastern sections of the route are yet to be finalised.

External links
 E8 at the European Ramblers' Association
 E8 full route map on Hiiker
 E8 on Traildino
 Digitalized Slovak part of E8, GPX download included
 E8 at The Long Distance Walkers Association
 maps, tracks, information and travellogs (in German) from Ireland to Romania 

Hiking trails in Germany
Long-distance footpaths in the United Kingdom
Long-distance trails in the Republic of Ireland
European long-distance paths